Caladenia septuosa, commonly known as the Koppio spider orchid, is a plant in the orchid family Orchidaceae and is endemic to South Australia. It is a ground orchid with a single erect, sparsely hairy leaf and usually only one greenish-cream flower with red stripes along the sepals and petals.

Description
Caladenia septuosa is a terrestrial, perennial, deciduous, herb with an underground tuber and a single erect, sparsely hairy leaf. Flowering occurs from September to October.

Taxonomy and naming
Caladenia septuosa  was first formally described in 1991 by David Jones and the description was published in Australian Orchid Research. The specific epithet (septuosa) is a Latin word meaning "obscure" referring to the small lateral lobes on the labellum.

Distribution and habitat
The Koppio spider orchid is endemic to the Eyre Peninsula where it grows in woodland.

Conservation
Caladenia septuosa is locally common and conserved in reserves.

References

septuosa
Plants described in 1991
Endemic orchids of Australia
Orchids of South Australia
Taxa named by David L. Jones (botanist)